Scottish Motor Traction (SMT) was founded in Edinburgh in 1905 by William Johnston Thomson. It operated buses in much of central Scotland. Aside from its traditional bus operations, it operated an air taxi service with a De Havilland Fox Moth between 18 July and 31 October 1932 and for many years owned Dryburgh Abbey Hotel. Following legislation, which allowed railway companies to invest in bus operators, the London & North Eastern Railway and London, Midland & Scottish Railway took a major stake in SMT in 1929. In 1930, following the takeover of another operator, SMT started its Edinburgh to London express coach service. SMT also acquired control of Walter Alexander & Sons bus services and coachbuilding operations, the Alexander family joining the SMT board.

SMT grew partly through the acquisition of smaller companies. Operations were decentralised to local areas, such as Central SMT in Lanarkshire, and Western SMT in south-west Scotland (both with red buses), whilst the east of Scotland services operated as SMT (with green buses).  Upon nationalisation of the SMT group's bus and coach services by the Attlee government in 1949, those of SMT itself were transferred to a new British Transport Commission subsidiary, Scottish Omnibuses Limited, which continued to operate as "SMT" until the early 1960s, when the fleet name "Eastern Scottish" was adopted. Meanwhile, the non bus operating activities remained in private hands as SMT Sales & Service Limited.

Following the demise of the British Transport Commission, the SMT operations became part of the state-owned Scottish Bus Group in 1962;  this later became the Scottish Transport Group in 1969 following the addition of ferry services.

The Transport Act 1985 led to the deregulation of bus services across the United Kingdom, followed by privatisation of the bus-operating Scottish Transport Group subsidiaries. Western Scottish (formerly Western SMT) was sold to its local management in 1991, and was bought out by the Stagecoach Group in 1994, which renamed it Stagecoach West Scotland. The ferry services, run as Caledonian MacBrayne remain owned by the Scottish Government.

Following privatisation, Eastern Scottish briefly reverted to its former name SMT. It was bought out by GRT Group in October 1994. 

In June 1995 GRT Group and Badgerline merged to create First Bus. Soon after this, SMT was split into two, with operations passing to neighbouring Lowland and Midland Bluebird, although the SMT name and livery were initially retained.  In 1999 the former SMT operations, along with those of Lowland and Midland Bluebird, were rebranded as First Edinburgh.

These were then sold on in 2022 with the Lowland Operations being sold to West Coast Motors who rebranded as Border Buses and Midland Bluebird Operations were sold to McGills Group who rebranded as Midland Bluebird by McGills and Eastern Scottish by McGills

See also
See Scottish Bus Group for the list of prefixes to the "Scottish" branding.

References

Former bus operators in Scotland
Transport in Edinburgh
Transport companies established in 1905
1905 establishments in Scotland
1962 disestablishments in Scotland